Billy Moeller (born 24 June 1949 in Sydney) is an Australian professional feather/super feather/light/light welter/welterweight boxer of the 1970s and '80s who won the Australian super featherweight title, and inaugural Commonwealth super featherweight title, and was a challenger for the New South Wales State (Australia) lightweight title against Jeff Malcolm, his professional fighting weight varied from , i.e. featherweight to , i.e. welterweight.

References

External links

Image - Billy Moeller

1949 births
Featherweight boxers
Lightweight boxers
Light-welterweight boxers
Living people
Boxers from Sydney
Super-featherweight boxers
Welterweight boxers
Australian male boxers
Commonwealth Boxing Council champions